Butterton railway station was a station on the Leek and Manifold Light Railway. It served the village of Butterton in Staffordshire. The site is now part of the Manifold Way including the impressive Swainsley Tunnel.

Route

References

Disused railway stations in Staffordshire
Railway stations in Great Britain opened in 1904
Railway stations in Great Britain closed in 1934
1904 establishments in England
1934 disestablishments in England
Former Leek and Manifold Light Railway stations